Acacia tetraneura is a shrub belonging to the genus Acacia and the subgenus Juliflorae that is endemic to western Australia.

Description
It has glabrous and resinous branchlets than can be sparsely haired at the ends. Like most species of Acacia it has phyllodes rather than true leaves. The erect, terete or flat blue-green coloured phyllodes have a linear to narrowly oblong shape and are often mostly shallowly incurved. It blooms from May to July producing yellow flowers. The glabrous, coriaceous-crustaceous seed pods that form after flowering have a linear shape but are slightly constricted between each of the seeds.

Distribution
It is native to an area in the Wheatbelt region of Western Australia where is commonly situated on low ridges and rises growing in clay soils with lateritic gravel. It is found around the Bruce Rock area in areas to the south west of Hyden where it is a part of open heathland communities.

See also
List of Acacia species

References

tetraneura
Acacias of Western Australia
Plants described in 1999
Taxa named by Bruce Maslin